Jacob Philip Wingerter (1833 in Bayern, Germany – March 11,
1916 in Cabo Verde, Minas Gerais, Brazil) was a Christian evangelist and German presbyter living in Brazil.

Immigration to the U.S.

Born on the banks of the River Rhine, in Bayern, at a time when Germany was going through severe economic crisis. It is known that between the years 1820 to 1890 the Germans totaled 30% of immigrants in the United States of America (U.S.). Around 1854, at age 21, Wingerter had also migrated to the U.S.

Initially he settled in Illinois, where he joined the Methodist Church. A few years later, he went to New Orleans (Louisiana) in search of work, already acting as an evangelist for distributing leaflets on Sundays and during the week when possible. After getting married and with two children, moved to Texas, but his family has died by accidental poisoning.

The serious political, social and economic conflict that led to the U.S. Civil War (1861–1865), only seven years after his arrival in the country, has hit everyone.  Wingerter went to work as a telegrapher, enlisting in the 28th. Texas Cavalry of the Confederate Army. After the war, living in a fallen state on the battlefield, had no right, no job.

The situation in the south was terrible because the victorious Army after defeating the southern rebels went to destroy and plunder their cities, homes and families.

Wingerter decided to migrate to Brazil in 1867 with a group of settlers led by former officers Frank McMullen and William Bowen. Of the approximately 130 people who made up this group, many were Confederate veterans and many traveled with their families. Wingerter brought his second wife, Susan, whom he married in Grimes County, Texas on July 4, 1865, and her daughter Amy.

Immigration to Brazil

The members of the colony left the port of Galveston, Texas aboard the old British ship "Derby". These southerners left the U.S. for a variety of reasons – to escape violence postwar, escape from the poverty, to obtain fertile land in a country with few cultural similarities. There was also the strong encouragement of the Brazilian government, the Emperor himself diligently D. Pedro II in bringing immigrants to the country. Before the trip, McMullen and Bowen were in Brazil and obtained from the Empire a land for the colony in São Paulo.

The old vessel, however, was shipwrecked near the island of Cuba, being rescued and taken to New York, facing severe storm that made them initially stop in the Virginia. After arriving in New York, finally managed to board the "North America" to Brazil. In May 1867, arrived in Rio de Janeiro and then went to Iguape, São Paulo (SP). Wingerter's wife, Susan, died a few months after giving birth to her son Carlos. Sometime later, with two small children, when we lived in Santa Barbara d'Oeste (SP), Wingerter marries for the third time, with Anna Luisa Büchner, daughter of an immigrant family. Then move on to Campinas (SP).

The Evangelist

Upon arriving in Brazil, Wingerter devoted himself to the evangelist action and in 1870, the physician and the Rev. Edward Lane, co-founder of the first Presbyterian Church of Brazil, invites him to work in the evangelization of the settlers of German origin living in São Paulo – SP. Wingerter joined the "Mission of Nashville", organized in Brazil by Nash and Edward Morton Lane to evangelize Americans southern Christians who came to the region of Campinas, besides seeking conversion of Brazilians.

Wingerter moved to Mogi Mirim (SP) and when the local church was organized, it becomes one of his priests.

In "Mission Nashville" acted as colporteur, i.e., distributed and sold religious tracts and Bibles in Portuguese, English and German. According to a letter written by the wife of Edward Lane, Mrs. Sarah Lane, Wingerter made copies of Bibles in villages or neighborhoods and come back six months or a year later, when he sold dozens of copies. For her, writing in May 1877 to the children of the Sunday school in Baltimore (USA) to thank a sum of money raised for the purchase of a wagon for the colporteur, Wingerter letter was "humble, patient, earnest, self-denying, laborious, tireless, always happy and willing to move anywhere or do anything that the work of spreading the Gospel demanded."

Wingerter was gradually playing a prominent role in supporting the expansion of the main leaders of the Presbyterian Church in Brazil. Worked in São Paulo (state), Minas Gerais, Goias and Mato Grosso. On many trips, accompanied him evangelistic pastors, such as the Reverend John W. Dabney, Delfino Teixeira and Miguel Torres. In August 1879, accompanied the Rev. Dabney on a trip to the city of Cabo Verde (Minas Gerais) and the district of Sao Bartolomeu de  Minas. In his later years, Wingerter would return to Cabo Verde with his family and there would be born their younger children.

In 1879, the Reverend John Boyle, who arrived in Brazil six years ago, settling initially in Recife (Pernambuco), moved to Mogi Mirim (SP), where Wingerter was already. This continued his hard work canvassing and preached the Gospel in cities like Casa Branca (SP), Mococa (SP), Ribeirão Preto (SP), Batatais (SP), Franca (SP), Santa Rita (now Santa Rita do Passa Quatro – SP), Uberaba (MG), Passos, Minas Gerais (MG), Santa Rita de Cassia (current Cássia – MG), Divisa Velha (current Campos Gerais – MG), Ventania (current Alpinópolis – MG) and Sao Simao, Goias. Bringing back to Mogi enthusiastic news about the existing opportunities to evangelization in Central Brazil, Wingerter encouraged the Rev. Boyle to do the same route in 1881 and 1882, a core mission for Presbyterian Church expansion in the Central Brazil.

In 1883, Wingerter was in Paracatu, Minas Gerais and again provided an encouraging report on the responsiveness to evangelical Christian faith. The following year, he and Boyle visited Bagagem – current Estrela do Sul (Minas Gerais – MG), Araguari (MG), Paracatu (MG), Formosa (GO) and Santa Luzia de Goias – current Luziânia (GO). In 1887, Boyle went to live in Bagagem at the region of "Triângulo Mineiro", to dedicate to the expansion of the Presbyterian Church in the region and in the state of Goias, but Boyle died suddenly in 1892. In the same year that the Presbyterian Church in Brazil also lost the Rev. Edward Lane.

The Rev. Alderi Souza Matos reports that in his last years, Wingerter worked for the American Bible Society. Says that the colporteurs were pioneers of a hard land, where the missionaries reaped the rewards. They suffered persecution and reproach, but always patiently sowed the Christian faith.

In the early twentieth century, Wingerter, his wife and minor children move to Cabo Verde, Minas Gerais (MG), where he remained until his death in 1916.

Descendants

Wingerter had many children. From his marriage to Susan left Amy and Carlos (born in Iguape in 1868 or 1869). From his marriage to Anna Buchner, left John William, born in 1871 or 1872; Jonas; Carlota, born in Mogi Mirim, in 1889; Luis Bruno, born in Mogi Mirim on September 15, 1891; Laura, born in Mogi Mirim on January 22, 1894; Felippe, born in Cabo  Verde in 1907 or 1908, Lydia, and Guilhermina.

Much of his descendants continued his Christian faith, usually linked to names Presbyterian, Baptist and Assembly of God.

The family name among his descendants has changed over the years. Could be found, in addition to the original version, Wingerter, Wingester, Wingeter, Wingerther, Wingter and Wengerter variations. There are other families Wingerter in Brazil, especially in the Northeast and São Paulo, including descendants of another Jacob Wingerter that came to Brazil in the twentieth century.

See also 
Protestantism in Brazil
Presbyterian Church of Brazil
Americans in Brazil

References

1833 births
1916 deaths
Protestantism in Brazil
German emigrants to Brazil